Ferenc Horváth (born 11 August 1939) is a retired Hungarian cyclist. He is born in Budapest, his profession is a Metalworker. He competed in the road race at the 1960 Summer Olympics, but failed to finish. He was third in the  Tour de Hongrie in 1962.

References 

1939 births
Living people
Cyclists at the 1960 Summer Olympics
Olympic cyclists of Hungary
Hungarian male cyclists